Tadoussac is a village in Quebec, Canada, at the confluence of the Saguenay and Saint Lawrence rivers. The indigenous Innu call the place Totouskak (plural for totouswk or totochak) meaning "bosom", probably in reference to the two round and sandy hills located on the west side of the village. According to other interpretations, it could also mean "place of lobsters", or "place where the ice is broken" (from the Innu shashuko). Although located in Innu territory, the post was also frequented by the Mi'kmaq people in the second half of the 16th century, who called it Gtatosag ("among the rocks").  Alternate spellings of Tadoussac over the centuries included Tadousac (17th and 18th centuries), Tadoussak, and Thadoyzeau (1550).
Tadoussac was first visited by Europeans in 1535 and was established in 1599 when the first trading post in Canada was formed there, in addition to a permanent settlement being placed in the same area that the Grand Hotel is located today.

History 

Jacques Cartier came to the site in 1535 during his second voyage. He found Innu people using it as a base for hunting seal. Later that same century, Basques conducted whaling expeditions on the river, as well as engaging in hides trade with the natives based in the shore at the mouth of the Sagueney.

Tadoussac was founded in 1599 by François Gravé Du Pont, a merchant, and Pierre de Chauvin de Tonnetuit, a captain of the French Royal Navy, when they acquired a fur trade monopoly from King Henry IV. Gravé and Chauvin built the settlement on the shore at the mouth of the Saguenay River, at its confluence with the St. Lawrence, to profit from its location. But the frontier was harsh and only five of the initial sixteen  settlers survived the first winter. In 1603, the tabagie or "feast" of Tadoussac reunited Gravé with Samuel de Champlain and with the Montagnais, the Algonquins, and the Etchimins." In 1615, the Mission of L'Exaltation-de-la-Sainte-Croix-de-Tadoussac, named in memory of a cross planted by Jean de Quen, was founded by the Récollet Order. Their missionary brothers sang the first Mass there two years later.

Tadoussac remained the only seaport on the St. Lawrence River for 30 years. Historians believe the St. Lawrence Iroquoians, who inhabited the St. Lawrence valley upriver to the west, were defeated and pushed out by the Mohawk before the early 17th century. By the late 17th and early 18th century, Tadoussac was the centre of fur trade between the French and First Nations peoples.  Competition over the fur trade increased among the nations. Colonists from the Tadoussac area were involved in whaling from 1632 until at least the end of the century.

In the 19th century, with industrialization reaching other parts of Canada, tourists discovered the appeal of this rural village. Wealthy Québécois built a number of vacation villas.  A Victorian hotel called the Hotel Tadoussac was built in 1864; it was expanded around 1900 and demolished in 1942, and replaced by a newer Hotel Tadoussac.

In 1855, the geographic township of Tadoussac was established. In 1899, it was incorporated as a village municipality. In 1937, the Parish Municipality of Tadoussac was formed, but dissolved in 1949 because it had less than 500 inhabitants.

Present day 

The modern village of Tadoussac lies close to the site of the original settlement at the mouth of the Saguenay River.  It is known as a tourist destination because of the rugged beauty of the Saguenay fjord and its facilities for whale watching.  The authority for the Port of Tadoussac was transferred in April 2012 to the Municipality of Tadoussac.

The entire area is either rural or still in a wilderness state, with several federal and provincial natural parks and preserves nearby which protect natural resources. Tadoussac encompasses the first marine national park of Canada.

Representation in other media 
The film The Hotel New Hampshire, based on the 1981 John Irving novel of the same name, was shot at the Hotel Tadoussac and released in 1984.
The introduction to the Goosebumps TV series was filmed in Tadoussac, with the Hotel Tadoussac visible in the background at the first scene.

Geography

Transportation 

Tadoussac is the north-east terminus of the Baie-Sainte-Catherine/Tadoussac ferry which offers free and frequent service across the Saguenay River. The ferry is part of Quebec Route 138 and the main link to Sept-Îles. The village is considered the gateway to the Manicouagan region.

Bus service to and from Quebec City and Montreal is offered by Intercar, twice a day, 7 days a week.

Tourism and attractions 
 Old chapel
 Trading post of Pierre Chauvin
 CIMM (Centre d'interprétation des mammifères marins), Center of Marine Mammal Interpretation
 Whale watching excursions in the Saguenay–St. Lawrence Marine Park
Club de Golf Tadoussac

Demographics 

Population trend:
 population in 2021: 814 {2016 to 2021 population change: 1.9%}
 population in 2016: 799 {2011 to 2016 population change: -1.7%}
 Population in 2011: 813 (2006 to 2011 population change: -4.4%)
 Population in 2006: 850 {2001 to 2006 population change:-2.2%}
 Population in 2001: 870 {1996 to 2001 population change:-4.7%}
 Population in 1996: 913 {1991 to 1996 population change:8.8%}
 Population in 1991: 832

Mother tongue:
 English as first language: 1.8%
 French as first language: 92.3%
 English and French as first language: 1.8%
 Other as first language: 4.1%

Gallery

See also 
 1925 Charlevoix–Kamouraska earthquake
 List of village municipalities in Quebec

References

External links 

 Tadoussac website
 The CIMM in Tadoussac

Villages in Quebec
Incorporated places in Côte-Nord
Hudson's Bay Company trading posts
New France
Populated places established in 1599
16th century in Quebec
La Haute-Côte-Nord Regional County Municipality